Civitella, a diminutive of Civita ("city"), is the name of over a dozen towns in Italy:

Comuni
 Civitella Alfedena, in the province of L'Aquila
 Civitella Casanova, in the province of Pescara
 Civitella d'Agliano, in the province of Viterbo
 Civitella del Tronto, in the province of Teramo
 Civitella di Romagna, in the province of Forlì-Cesena
 Civitella in Val di Chiana, in the province of Arezzo
 Civitella Messer Raimondo, in the province of Chieti
 Civitella Paganico, in the province of Grosseto
 Civitella Roveto, in the province of L'Aquila
 Civitella San Paolo, in the province of Rome

Frazioni
 Civitella Benazzone, of Perugia in the province of Perugia
 Civitella Cesi, of Blera in the province of Viterbo
 Civitella del Lago, of Baschi in the province of Terni
 Civitella Licinio, of Cusano Mutri in the province of Benevento
 Civitella Marittima, of Civitella Paganico in the province of Grosseto

 Localities
 Civitella (Casacalenda), a locality or frazione in the comune of Casacalenda in the province of Campobasso
 Civitella (Larino), a locality or frazione in the comune of Larino in the province of Campobasso
 Civitella (Marzano Appio), a locality or frazione in the comune of Marzano Appio in the province of Caserta
 Civitella (Pescorocchiano), a locality or frazione in the comune of Pescorocchiano in the province of Rieti
 Civitella (Serravalle di Chienti), a locality or frazione in the comune of Serravalle di Chienti in the province of Macerata
 Civitella (Vastogirardi), a locality or frazione in the comune of Vastogirardi in the province of Isernia
 Civitella (Scheggino), a locality or frazione in the comune of Scheggino in the province of Perugia
 Civitella (Sellano), a locality or frazione in the comune of Sellano in the province of Perugia
 Civitella d'Arna, a locality or frazione in the comune of Perugia in the province of Perugia
 Civitella de' Conti, a locality in the comune of the San Venanzo in the province of Terni
 Civitella di Licenza, a locality or frazione in the comune of Licenza in the province of Rome
 Civitella Ranieri, a locality or frazione in the comune of Umbertide in the province of Perugia

See also
Civita (disambiguation)